Ettore Conti di Verampio, Count of Verampio OML, OMRI, OCI  (1871-1972, Milan, Kingdom of Italy) was an Italian senator, industrialist, and aristocrat.

Biography 
Ettore Conti di Verampio was born on April 24, 1871 in Milan, the son of Carlo Conti and Giuseppina Palazzoli.

The count taught Construction Sciences at the Polytechnic University of Milan, and dedicated himself to the development of Italy's growing electrical industry. In 1901 The Count of Verampio founded the Conti & Co Electrical Company, the first in Italy to carry out the large scale transport of electricity to households across the country, it did so using large waterfalls and water basins.

From 1918 to 1919 the count served as the Undersecretary for the Liquidation of Weapons and Munitions at the Ministry of the Treasury. In 1919 Conti became a Conservative Party Senator appointed by Vittorio Emanuele III. Conti also presided over the Italian Caucasus Campaign, he was also a key participant in the Genoa Conference.

Conti directed Confindustria, an industrial association between the renowned oil and energy companies, AGIP and Châtillon.

Conti retired from his position as owner of the Conti Electricity Company and became the president of the newly formed AGIP (Italian National Gas Company), a position he left after only two years, citing the numerous corporate positions assumed in the interest of the BCI (Banca Commerciale Italiana) as the reason for his departure. Conti was given a knighthood in 1931 in recognition of his industrial achievements for the Kingdom of Italy.

Involvement in Fascism 
Conti Joined the National Fascist Party in 1932 and strongly adhered to the political purposes of the regime, however he was undoubtedly critical towards the adherence to some important economic policy choices. Due to his friendship with Benito Mussolini, Conti was one of the few people to criticise him without fear of punishment or death. Conti enjoyed particular consideration from the Duce, so much so that in 1928 Mussolini asked Conti to accompany his daughter Edda Mussolini during the 11th cruise of the Italian Naval League in India, in the hopes that his wife the Countess of Casati would help educate his daughter.

Conti had extensive meetings and conversations with Hermann Göring and Adolf Hitler in Berlin at the International Chamber of Commerce conference, he continued to maintain ties with a number of Nazi leaders throughout the war.

In 1938 Conti was made the Extraordinary Ambassador of the Italian Economic Mission in Japan and Manchukuo, this was done to build commercial relationships with the Italy's new Asian allies. On the date of his inauguration Conti signed the treaties of alliance alongside the Italian Ambassador Giacinto Auriti and the Japanese General Kazushige Ugaki. In 1945 Conti was found innocent of having committed any war crimes and was later made president of the Rotary Club of Italy for his life achievements and philanthropy.

Death 
The Count of Verampio passed away as a result of natural causes on December 13, 1972 in Milan at his Palazzo, La Casa degli Atellani.

Honours 
 - Grand Officer of the Order of the Crown of Italy

 - Knight of The Order of Merit for Labour

 - Grand Officer of the Order of Merit of the Italian Republic

References

1871 births
1972 deaths
Engineers from Milan
Presidents of Confindustria
Italian centenarians
Men centenarians
20th-century Italian businesspeople